Julian Bryant (May 13, 1866 – October 1, 1932) was an American politician who served in the Virginia House of Delegates and Virginia Senate. Later in life, he was elected Commonwealth's attorney of Craig and Alleghany counties.

References

External links 

1866 births
1932 deaths
American politicians who committed suicide
Democratic Party members of the Virginia House of Delegates
Suicides by firearm in Virginia
19th-century American politicians
20th-century American politicians